"Tennessee Wig Walk" (also "The Tennessee Wig-Walk") is a popular song by the American composer Larry Coleman, with lyrics by Norman Gimbel.

The sheet cover was published by Francis, Day & Hunter Ltd. in 1953. The lyrics include the refrain "Doin' the Tennessee wig walk" and the song was used as dance music.

The song was recorded by Bonnie Lou in 1953 under the Parlaphone record label. The recording was in The Billboard Top Country & Western Records US National Best Sellers top ten list during 1953, reaching number 6. In the same year, it was released as a single on the Decca label by the American big band Russ Morgan And His Orchestra "Music In The Morgan Manner"* as "The Tennessee Wig-Walk".

Later, Lena Zavaroni included the song on her second album (If My Friends Could See Me Now, 1974) and third album (Lena Zavaroni in South Africa, 1975). The song was re-released on a CD compilation album of Bonnie Lou songs entitled "Doin' The Tennessee Wig Walk: The Best Of The King Years" in 2000 on the Westside label.

See also
 1953 in country music

References

External links
 
 
 

1953 songs
1953 singles
Country pop songs
Songs with music by Larry Coleman
Songs about Tennessee
Bonnie Lou songs
Parlophone singles
Decca Records singles